The 2022 American League Wild Card Series were two best-of-three playoff series in Major League Baseball (MLB) that determined the participating teams of the 2022 American League Division Series (ALDS). Both Wild Card Series began on October 7, with Game 2s scheduled for October 8. ESPN broadcast both Wild Card Series in the United States, and games were also broadcast by ESPN Radio. For the first time, Canadian rightsholder Sportsnet – a sibling property to the Toronto Blue Jays under Rogers Communications – was allowed to produce its own broadcast of a Blue Jays postseason series; in previous years, it was required to simulcast a U.S. or MLB International broadcast.

The Cleveland Guardians defeated the Tampa Bay Rays to advance to the ALDS against the New York Yankees, and the Seattle Mariners defeated the Toronto Blue Jays to advance to the ALDS against the Houston Astros.

Background
On March 10, Major League Baseball changed the postseason structure for the first time since 2012, adding a sixth team to the postseason in each league, awarding the top two seeds in each league to receive a bye into the Division Series, and added a best-of-three Wild Card round, with the higher seed hosting all three games. The lowest-seeded division winner, and three wild card teams (each seeded according to regular season record), will play in this round. The third seed will play the sixth seed, and the fourth seed will play the fifth seed. The postseason structure is similar to the temporarily format MLB used in 2020 due to the COVID-19 pandemic without first-round byes for the top two seeds in 2020.

The Cleveland Guardians (92–70) clinched the American League Central, were locked into the third seed as the worst American League division winner in terms of record on September 25, their first postseason appearance since 2020, their first under the Guardians moniker, and are hosting the Tampa Bay Rays (86–76), who clinched a postseason berth, their fourth straight postseason appearance and eighth overall in franchise history, with all eight coming since 2008, on September 30. In six regular-season meetings in 2022, the Guardians bested the Rays 4–2, including two out of three less than a week ago in Cleveland.

The Toronto Blue Jays (92–70) clinched a postseason berth on September 29 and secured home-field advantage in the wild card round as the best wild card team (non-division winner) in terms of record on October 3. After missing out on the postseason by one game last year, the Blue Jays are making their first appearance since 2020 and accomplished back-to-back 90-win seasons for the first time since 1992 and 1993, which was the seasons they repeated as champions. They are hosting the 1977-expansion cousins Seattle Mariners (90–72), who clinched their first postseason berth since 2001, ending the longest postseason drought in North American professional sports on September 30. The Mariners won the regular-season series 5–2 over the Blue Jays in 2022, which included a four-game sweep in July in Seattle. Despite handling Toronto for those seven games, the Mariners only outscored the Blue Jays 26–21 on the season.

As the top two seeds, the Houston Astros (106–56) and New York Yankees (99–63) earned a bye and home-field advantage in the ALDS.

Matchups

Cleveland Guardians vs. Tampa Bay Rays

Toronto Blue Jays vs. Seattle Mariners

Cleveland vs. Tampa Bay
This was the second postseason match-up between Cleveland and Tampa Bay. The two teams previously met in the 2013 American League Wild Card Game when Tampa Bay defeated Cleveland 4–0.

Game 1

Game 1 featured a pitching duel between Cy Young candidates Shane Bieber and Shane McClanahan. The game was scoreless until a José Siri solo home run in the top of the sixth inning, which would immediately be topped by a José Ramírez two-run home run in the bottom of the sixth. Bieber went , only throwing 99 pitches on the day while not allowing a hit until the fifth inning. Two runs would be all the Guardians needed as Emmanuel Clase closed the game with a perfect ninth, giving the All-Star closer his first career postseason save.

At a brisk two hours and 17 minutes, it was the shortest postseason game since Game 2 of the 1999 NLDS between the Braves and Astros.

Game 2

In the contest, the Rays and Guardians used eight pitchers each and totaled 39 strikeouts. The Guardians came close to scoring in the bottom of the sixth, where they had the bases loaded with no outs, but José Ramírez struck out and Josh Naylor grounded into a double play to end the inning scoreless. The Rays had runners on the corners on the top of the 12th, but Ramírez turned a ground ball by Manuel Margot into a difficult out at first base to end the inning. In the bottom of the 13th, with both teams having increasingly depleted bullpens, ace Corey Kluber made his first relief appearance in more than nine years, that would eventually end up surrendering the walk-off home run to Oscar González. Sam Hentges, on the other hand, lasted the longest among all relievers, pitching the last three full innings for Cleveland while not allowing a single hit, striking out six batters and earning the win. It was Cleveland's first postseason series win since the 2016 American League Championship Series.

With 14 innings scoreless for both teams, this was the longest scoreless postseason game in Major League history, until the Astros and Mariners surpassed it a week later in Game 3 of the 2022 American League Division Series. For Tampa Bay, the walk-off series-ending loss was their seventh straight loss (regular season and postseason).

Toronto vs. Seattle
This was the first postseason match-up between Toronto and Seattle.

Game 1

Blue Jays starter Alek Manoah began the game by hitting the Mariners' star rookie outfielder Julio Rodriguez. Two batters later, Eugenio Suárez flipped a line drive down the right field line for an RBI double, scoring Rodríguez. Cal Raleigh then worked Manoah a full count before hitting a home run over the right field fence to give the Mariners a 3–0 lead in the top of the first. In the Seattle fifth, Suarez drove in another run when his fielder's choice plated Rodriguez. Four runs would be all that Mariners ace Luis Castillo needed, as the big trade deadline acquisition twirled a shutout over  innings, striking out five and allowing just six hits. Castillo was the first ever Mariners pitcher to throw at least seven scoreless innings in a postseason game.

Andres Munoz relieved Castillo in the eighth and finished off the game for Seattle with a five-out performance, giving the team its first postseason victory since Game 3 of the 2001 American League Championship Series. For the Blue Jays, George Springer and Matt Chapman each had two hits, while Toronto relievers combined for  scoreless innings after Manoah exited the game.

Game 2

In Game 2, Seattle came back from a seven-run deficit to clinch the series, in what would become the second largest comeback in MLB postseason history.

The Mariners' Robbie Ray, a Cy Young Award winner for the Blue Jays the preceding year, faced off against Toronto's Kevin Gausman, who was brought in during the off-season to essentially replace Ray. The Blue Jays got off to a fast start, scoring four runs on a two-run home run by Teoscar Hernández in the bottom of the second, a run batted in by Vladimir Guerrero Jr. in the third, and another home run by Hernández in the fourth which chased Ray. The Mariners got their first hit in the fifth inning, when a sacrifice fly by Jarred Kelenic got them on the board. With the score now 4–1, the Blue Jays increased their lead by scoring four more runs off Seattle middle reliever Paul Sewald. However, in the top of the sixth, Gausman loaded the bases on three consecutive singles. After a strikeout and a pop out, he was relieved by Tim Mayza, who allowed Seattle to cut the lead down to 8–5 on a wild pitch and a three-run home run from Carlos Santana. The Blue Jays extended their lead by a run in the seventh on a Danny Jansen single scoring Matt Chapman.

Seattle responded in the top of the eighth inning, cutting the score to 9–6 after four straight batters reached base. With the bases loaded again, Toronto's closer Jordan Romano (who was brought in to relieve Anthony Bass with runners on first and second with no outs) struck out Santana and Dylan Moore before George Springer and Bo Bichette collided on a bloop bases-clearing double by J. P. Crawford to improbably tie the game at nine. Springer got the worse of the collision and had to be carted off the field. After reliever Andrés Muñoz allowed no runs in the bottom of the eighth, the Mariners took the lead in the top of the ninth on a Adam Frazier double scoring Cal Raleigh, who also doubled earlier in the inning. In the bottom of the ninth, rookie starter George Kirby worked around a one-out walk to Chapman to earn the first save of his career and send the Mariners to the American League Division Series.

See also
2022 National League Wild Card Series

References

External links
Major League Baseball postseason schedule

Wild Card Series
Cleveland Guardians postseason
Seattle Mariners postseason
Tampa Bay Rays postseason
Toronto Blue Jays postseason
Major League Baseball Wild Card Series
American League Wild Card Series
American League Wild Card Series
American League Wild Card Series
American League Wild Card Series
American League Wild Card Series
Baseball competitions in Cleveland
Baseball competitions in Toronto